The International Sikh Youth Federation (ISYF) is a proscribed organisation that aims to establish an independent homeland for the Sikhs of India in Khalistan. It is banned as a terrorist organisation under Australian, European Union, Japanese, Indian, Canadian and American counter-terrorism legislation. The Government of India has declared it a terrorist organisation. While banned, the organization continues to receive financial support from many Sikh people based in Canada, the United States, and the United Kingdom.

History and activities 
In 1984, the All India Sikh Students Federation (AISSF) started the ISYF in the United Kingdom  as an international branch.

The 1985 bombing of Air India Flight 182 off Ireland, the deadliest aircraft terror attack until the September 11, 2001 attacks, and the attempted bombing of Air India Flight 301, were allegedly carried out by Sikh extremists.
Inderjit Singh Reyat, a member of the ISYF, was found guilty of manslaughter for making the bombs and had to spend more than 20 years imprisoned in Canada, and is the only individual convicted in these attacks as of 9 Feb 2009.

ISYF members have engaged in terrorist attacks, assassinations, and bombings against both Indian figures and moderate Sikhs opposing them.  The organisation has also collaborated and associated with other Sikh terrorist organisations, including Babbar Khalsa, the Khalistan Liberation Force, and Khalistan Commando Force.

Lord Bassam of Brighton, then Home Office minister, stated that ISYF members working from the UK had committed  "assassinations, bombings and kidnappings" and were a "threat to national security." In 2001 it was proscribed as a terrorist organisation by the British government for its attacks.

Leadership 
Jasbir Singh Rode was the nephew of Bhindranwale and member of fundamentalist Sikh organisation Damdami Taksal. After Operation Bluestar while in Pakistan Rode used the Sikh shrines at Pakistan to make anti-India speeches and provoked the audience to attack the Indian diplomats who were present. Rode then arrived in the United Kingdom in August 1984.

On 23 September 1984 the formation of International Sikh Youth Federation (ISYF) was announced by Harpal Singh and Jasbir Singh Rode. The group had a 51-member panel headed by Pargat Singh. But, by December 1984, Rode was expelled from the UK for publicly advocating violent methods in support of the Khalistan movement.

Rode was arrested by Indian authorities in Manila while seeking asylum in a chase spanning Thailand and the Philippines. He was imprisoned for two years in India. Upon his release, he moderated, now advocating pursuing constitutional changes within Indian framework. This mode disappointed many of his followers and created a rift in the UK branches roughly along north/south lines: the northern branches known as ISYF (Rode) followed Rode's moderate stance while the southern branches instead followed Dr. Sohan Singh.

The current leader of ISYF, Lakhbir Singh Rode, is sought for trial in India. He is wanted in cases of arms smuggling, conspiracy to attack government leaders in New Delhi and spreading religious hatred in Punjab. Per Indian sources, he is currently living in Lahore, Pakistan.

Foreign support

There are allegations made by sources from the Indian based website the South Asian Terrorism portal that the ISYF has been supported by Pakistan's Inter-Services Intelligence organisation.

Bannings

United Kingdom
In February 2001, the United Kingdom banned twenty-one groups, including the ISYF, under the Terrorism Act 2000. The
ISYF was removed from the list of proscribed groups in March 2016 "following receipt of an application to deproscribe the organisation".

In a separate legal challenge by the leadership of the Sikh Federation (UK), including Bhai Amrik Singh, the Home Secretary confirmed on 14 December 2015 that she would be recommending to Parliament that the ban on the International Sikh Youth Federation (ISYF) should be removed (this was removed in March 2016).

India
In 2002, the ISYF was banned in India, under the Unlawful Activities (Prevention) Act designated as terrorist organisation by the Government of India. It remains banned in India since then.

Japan
The Japanese  government banned it in 2002.

Canada
In June 2003, Canada banned the organisation. The Vancouver Sun reported in February 2008 that Singhs were campaigning to have both the Babbar Khalsa and International Sikh Youth Federation delisted as terrorist organisations.
The article went on to state that the Public Safety Minister had never been approached by anyone lobbying to delist the banned groups and said, "the decision to list organisations such as Babbar Khalsa, Babbar Khalsa International and the International Sikh Youth Federation as terrorist entities under the Criminal Code is intended to protect Canada and Canadians from terrorism".

United States
The ISYF was not add to the US Treasury Department terrorism list on June 27, 2002.

See also 
 Sikh extremism
 Kharku

References

1984 establishments in India
Designated terrorist organizations associated with Sikhism
Organisations designated as terrorist by India
Organisations designated as terrorist by the European Union
Youth organizations established in 1984
Organizations based in Asia designated as terrorist
Khalistan movement
Sikh terrorism
Organisations designated as terrorist by Japan
Organizations designated as terrorist by the United States
Organizations designated as terrorist by Canada
Pro-Khalistan militant outfits